The 2018 Duke Blue Devils men's soccer team represented Duke University during the 2018 NCAA Division I men's soccer season.  The Blue Devils were led by head coach John Kerr, in his eleventh season.  They played home games at Koskinen Stadium.  The team was founded in 1935 and currently plays in the Atlantic Coast Conference.

Background

The 2017 Duke men's soccer team finished the season with a 13–4–3 overall record and a 4–3–1 ACC record.  The Blue Devils were seeded fourth–overall in the 2017 ACC Men's Soccer Tournament, where they lost to Clemson in the Quarterfinals.  The Blue Devils earned an at-large bid into the 2017 NCAA Division I Men's Soccer Tournament.  As the sixth–overall seed in the tournament, Duke hosted FIU in the Second Round.  Duke won 2–1 and progressed to face Fordham at home.  Duke was upset on penalties after the game ended 2–2 to end their season.

At the end of the season, three Blue Devils men's soccer players were selected in the 2018 MLS SuperDraft: Brian White, Carter Manley and Markus Fjørtoft.

Player movement

Players leaving

Players arriving

Squad

Roster

Updated August 6, 2018

Team management

Source:

Schedule 
Source:

|-
!colspan=8 style=""| Exhibition

|-
!colspan=7 style=""| Regular season

|-
!colspan=8 style=""| ACC Tournament

|-
!colspan=6 style=""| NCAA Tournament

Awards and honors

2019 MLS Super Draft

Duke did not have any players selected in the 2019 MLS SuperDraft.

Rankings

References

Duke Blue Devils men's soccer seasons
Duke
2018 in sports in North Carolina
Duke
Duke